Donald Vega is a Nicaraguan-born American jazz pianist and music composer.

Early life
Vega was born in Masaya, Nicaragua, a town well known for its handicrafts. He was born with a severe cleft palate, for which he has had many surgeries to correct and save his hearing. He fled the country at the age of 15, arriving in Los Angeles in 1989. In the late 1990s he was at risk of being returned to his native country as a consequence of the Immigration Reform Act of 1996. With the aid of friends and supporters, he is now a legal resident.

Vega received his early education at Crenshaw High School. He is an alumnus of the University of Southern California, Manhattan School of Music, and the Juilliard School. He is currently a professor at the Juilliard School, living in New York City.

Career
Some of his competitive winnings include The Los Angeles Music Center's Spotlight Award in 1991, Down Beat's 2007 Jazz Student Soloist Award and 1st place at the 2008 Philips Jazz Piano Competition at the University of West Florida, as well as an original composition featured in the CD accompanying JAZZIZ's October 2008 Education Issue.

Discography
Kirk Edwards: “The AKA Project”, 2022
Eric Wyatt: “A Song of Hope”, 2021
Shirley Crabbe: “Bridges”, 2018
Dan Adler: “Friends On The Moon”, 2018
Ron Carter with Donald Vega & Russell Malone: “Golden Striker (Live at Theaterstubchen Kassel”, 2017
Brandon Lee: “Common Thread”, 2017
Letizia Gambi: “Blue Monday”, 2016
Donald Vega: “With Respect To Monty”, 2015
Clarence Penn: “Monk: The Lost Files”, 2014
Lauren Meccia: “Inside Your Eyes”, 2014
Jason Stewart: “Cyclicality”, 2013
Donald Vega: "Spiritual Nature”, 2012
Ron Carter Trio:  “Cocktails At The Cotton Club”, 2012
Clifton Anderson: “And so We Carry On”, 2012
Bryan Carter: “Enchantment”, 2011
Claudio Roditi: "Bons Amigos", 2011
Shirley Crabbe: "Home", 2011 (Produced by Donald Vega)
Behn Gillece and Ken Fowser: "Duotone", 2011
Village Orchestra Playaz, Alfredo Rivera & DJK: “Black Maya Voodo”, 2010
Karen Francis: “Nostalgia”, 2010
Brandon Lee: "Absolute-lee", 2010
Donald Vega: "Tomorrows" 2008
Bennie Wallace: “Disorder at the Border”, 2007
Anthony Wilson: “Power of Nine”, 2007
Ryan Cross and Lorca Hart: “Cross Hart Jazz Experience”, 2006
Justo Almario: "Love Thy Neighbor" , 2004
Jose Rizo's Jazz on the Latin Side All-Stars: “The Last Bull Fighter” 2004
Francisco Aguabella: “Ochimini”, 2004
Al McKibbon: “Black Orchid”, 2003
Ronald Muldrow: "Mapenzi" 2003
Francisco Aguabella: “Cubacan”, 2002
Francisco Aguabella: “Agua de Cuba”, 1999
Anthony Wilson: “Adult Themes”, 1999

References

External links
DonaldVega.com Official website.

1974 births
Living people
People from Masaya
Nicaraguan pianists
Nicaraguan emigrants to the United States
American jazz pianists
American male pianists
21st-century American pianists
21st-century American male musicians
American male jazz musicians
Resonance Records artists
Crenshaw High School alumni